Greenland is an island country in North America that is part of the Kingdom of Denmark. It is located between the Arctic and Atlantic oceans, east of the Canadian Arctic Archipelago. Greenland is the world's largest island. It is one of three constituent countries that form the Kingdom of Denmark, along with Denmark and the Faroe Islands; the citizens of these countries are all citizens of Denmark and the European Union. Greenland's capital is Nuuk.

Though a part of the continent of North America, Greenland has been politically and culturally associated with Europe (specifically Norway and Denmark, the colonial powers) for more than a millennium, beginning in 986. Greenland has been inhabited at intervals over at least the last 4,500 years by Arctic peoples whose forebears migrated there from what is now Canada. Norsemen settled the uninhabited southern part of Greenland beginning in the 10th century, having previously settled Iceland. Inuit arrived in the 13th century. Though under continuous influence of Norway and Norwegians, Greenland was not formally under the Norwegian crown until 1261. The Norse colonies disappeared in the late 15th century, after Norway was hit by the Black Death and entered a severe decline.

In the early 17th century, Danish explorers reached Greenland again. Greenland became Danish in 1814 and was fully integrated in the Danish state in 1953 under the Constitution of Denmark. With the Constitution of 1953, the people in Greenland became citizens of Denmark. In 1979, Denmark granted home rule to Greenland; in 2008, Greenlanders voted in favour of the Self-Government Act, which transferred more power from the Danish government to the local Greenlandic government. Under the new structure, Greenland has gradually assumed responsibility for a number of governmental services and areas of competence. The Danish government still retains control of citizenship, monetary policy and foreign affairs including defence. The majority of its residents are Inuit. Today, the population is concentrated mainly on the southwest coast, while the rest of the island is sparsely populated. Three-quarters of Greenland is covered by the only permanent ice sheet outside of Antarctica. With a population of 56,081 (2020), it is the least densely populated region in the world. Greenland has one of the highest shares of renewable energy in the world, at 70%, mostly coming from hydropower.

Etymology

The early Norse settlers named the island as Greenland. In the Icelandic sagas, the Norwegian-born Icelander Erik the Red was exiled from Iceland for manslaughter. Along with his extended family and his thralls (i.e. slaves or serfs), he set out in ships to explore an icy land known to lie to the northwest. After finding a habitable area and settling there, he named it  (translated as "Greenland"), supposedly in the hope that the pleasant name would attract settlers. The Saga of Erik the Red states: "In the summer, Erik left to settle in the country he had found, which he called Greenland, as he said people would be attracted there if it had a favorable name."

The Kalaallit are the Greenlandic Inuit who inhabit the country's western region.

The military of the United States used  as a code name for Greenland in World War II, where they kept several bases named as Bluie (East or West) (sequential numeral).

History

Early Paleo-Inuit cultures

In prehistoric times, Greenland was home to several successive Paleo-Inuit cultures known today primarily through archaeological finds. The earliest entry of the Paleo-Inuit into Greenland is thought to have occurred about 2500 BC. From around 2500 BC to 800 BC, southern and western Greenland were inhabited by the Saqqaq culture. Most finds of Saqqaq-period archaeological remains have been around Disko Bay, including the site of Saqqaq, after which the culture is named.

From 2400 BC to 1300 BC, the Independence I culture existed in northern Greenland. It was a part of the Arctic small tool tradition. Towns, including Deltaterrasserne, started to appear. Around 800 BC, the Saqqaq culture disappeared and the Early Dorset culture emerged in western Greenland and the Independence II culture in northern Greenland. The Dorset culture was the first culture to extend throughout the Greenlandic coastal areas, both on the west and east coasts. It lasted until the total onset of the Thule culture in 1500 AD. The Dorset culture population lived primarily from hunting of whales and caribou.

Norse settlement

From 986, Greenland's west coast was settled by Icelanders and Norwegians, through a contingent of 14 boats led by Erik the Red. They formed three settlements – known as the Eastern Settlement, the Western Settlement and the Middle Settlement – on fjords near the southwesternmost tip of the island. They shared the island with the late Dorset culture inhabitants who occupied the northern and western parts, and later with the Thule culture that entered from the north. Norse Greenlanders submitted to Norwegian rule in 1261 under the Kingdom of Norway. Later, the Kingdom of Norway entered into a personal union with Denmark in 1380 and from 1397 was a part of the Kalmar Union.

The Norse settlements, such as Brattahlíð, thrived for centuries but disappeared sometime in the 15th century, perhaps at the onset of the Little Ice Age. Apart from some runic inscriptions, the only contemporary records or historiography that survives from the Norse settlements is of their contact with Iceland or Norway. Medieval Norwegian sagas and historical works mention Greenland's economy as well as the bishops of Gardar and the collection of tithes. A chapter in the Konungs skuggsjá (The King's Mirror) describes Norse Greenland's exports and imports as well as grain cultivation.

Icelandic saga accounts of life in Greenland were composed in the 13th century and later, and do not constitute primary sources for the history of early Norse Greenland. Those accounts are closer to primary for more contemporaneous accounts of late Norse Greenland. Modern understanding therefore mostly depends on the physical data from archeological sites. Interpretation of ice core and clam shell data suggests that between 800 and 1300 AD the regions around the fjords of southern Greenland experienced a relatively mild climate several degrees Celsius higher than usual in the North Atlantic with trees and herbaceous plants growing and livestock being farmed. Barley was grown as a crop up to the 70th parallel. The ice cores indicate Greenland has had dramatic temperature shifts many times over the past 100,000 years. Similarly the Icelandic Book of Settlements records famines during the winters, in which "the old and helpless were killed and thrown over cliffs".

These Icelandic settlements vanished during the 14th and early 15th centuries. The demise of the Western Settlement coincides with a decrease in summer and winter temperatures. A study of North Atlantic seasonal temperature variability during the Little Ice Age showed a significant decrease in maximum summer temperatures beginning in the late 13th century to early 14th century – as much as  lower than modern summer temperatures. The study also found that the lowest winter temperatures of the last 2,000 years occurred in the late 14th century and early 15th century. The Eastern Settlement was likely abandoned in the early to mid-15th century, during this cold period.

Theories drawn from archeological excavations at Herjolfsnes in the 1920s suggest that the condition of human bones from this period indicates that the Norse population was malnourished, possibly because of soil erosion resulting from the Norsemen's destruction of natural vegetation in the course of farming, turf-cutting, and wood-cutting. Malnutrition may also have resulted from widespread deaths from pandemic plague; the decline in temperatures during the Little Ice Age; and armed conflicts with the Skrælings (Norse word for Inuit, meaning "wretches"). Recent archeological studies somewhat challenge the general assumption that the Norse colonization had a dramatic negative environmental effect on the vegetation. Data support traces of a possible Norse soil amendment strategy. More recent evidence suggests that the Norse, who never numbered more than about 2,500, gradually abandoned the Greenland settlements over the 15th century as walrus ivory, the most valuable export from Greenland, decreased in price because of competition with other sources of higher-quality ivory, and that there was actually little evidence of starvation or difficulties.

Other explanations of the disappearance of the Norse settlements have been proposed:
 Lack of support from the homeland.
 Ship-borne marauders (such as Basque, English, or German pirates) rather than Skrælings, could have plundered and displaced the Greenlanders.
 They were "the victims of hidebound thinking and of a hierarchical society dominated by the Church and the biggest land owners. In their reluctance to see themselves as anything but Europeans, the Greenlanders failed to adopt the kind of apparel that the Inuit employed as protection against the cold and damp or to borrow any of the Inuit hunting gear."
 That portion of the Greenlander population willing to adopt Inuit ways and means intermarried with and assimilated into the Inuit community. Vilhjalmur Stefansson, Unsolved Mysteries of the Arctic, 1938, chapter 1. Much of the Greenland population today is mixed Inuit and European ancestry. It was impossible in 1938 when Stefansson wrote his book to distinguish between intermarriage before the European loss of contact and after the contact was restored.
 "Norse society's structure created a conflict between the short-term interests of those in power, and the long-term interests of the society as a whole."

Thule culture (1300–present)

The Thule people are the ancestors of the current Greenlandic population. No genes from the Paleo-Inuit have been found in the present population of Greenland. The Thule culture migrated eastward from what is now known as Alaska around 1000 AD, reaching Greenland around 1300. The Thule culture was the first to introduce to Greenland such technological innovations as dog sleds and toggling harpoons.

There is an account of contact and conflict with the Norse population, as told by the Inuit. It is republished in The Norse Atlantic Sagas, by Gwyn Jones. Jones reports that there is also an account of perhaps the same incident, of more doubtful provenance, told by the Norse side.

1500–1814
In 1500, King Manuel I of Portugal sent Gaspar Corte-Real to Greenland in search of a Northwest Passage to Asia which, according to the Treaty of Tordesillas, was part of Portugal's sphere of influence. In 1501, Corte-Real returned with his brother, Miguel Corte-Real. Finding the sea frozen, they headed south and arrived in Labrador and Newfoundland. Upon the brothers' return to Portugal, the cartographic information supplied by Corte-Real was incorporated into a new map of the world which was presented to Ercole I d'Este, Duke of Ferrara, by Alberto Cantino in 1502. The Cantino planisphere, made in Lisbon, accurately depicts the southern coastline of Greenland.

In 1605–1607, King Christian IV of Denmark and Norway sent a series of expeditions to Greenland and Arctic waterways to locate the lost eastern Norse settlement and assert Danish-norwegian sovereignty over Greenland. The expeditions were mostly unsuccessful, partly due to leaders who lacked experience with the difficult Arctic ice and weather conditions, and partly because the expedition leaders were given instructions to search for the Eastern Settlement on the east coast of Greenland just north of Cape Farewell, which is almost inaccessible due to southward drifting ice. The pilot on all three trips was English explorer James Hall.

After the Norse settlements died off, Greenland came under the de facto control of various Inuit groups, but the Danish government never forgot or relinquished the claims to Greenland that it had inherited from the Norse. When it re-established contact with Greenland in the early 17th century, Denmark asserted its sovereignty over the island. In 1721, a joint mercantile and clerical expedition led by Danish-Norwegian missionary Hans Egede was sent to Greenland, not knowing whether a Norse civilization remained there. This expedition is part of the Dano-Norwegian colonization of the Americas. After 15 years in Greenland, Hans Egede left his son Paul Egede in charge of the mission there and returned to Denmark, where he established a Greenland Seminary. This new colony was centred at Godthåb ("Good Hope") on the southwest coast. Gradually, Greenland was opened up to Danish merchants, but closed to those from other countries.

Treaty of Kiel to World War II

When the union between the crowns of Denmark and Norway was dissolved in 1814, the Treaty of Kiel severed Norway's former colonies and left them under the control of the Danish monarch. Norway occupied then-uninhabited eastern Greenland as Erik the Red's Land in July 1931, claiming that it constituted terra nullius. Norway and Denmark agreed to submit the matter in 1933 to the Permanent Court of International Justice, which decided against Norway.

Greenland's connection to Denmark was severed on 9 April 1940, early in World War II, after Denmark was occupied by Nazi Germany. On 8 April 1941, the United States occupied Greenland to defend it against a possible invasion by Germany. The United States occupation of Greenland continued until 1945. Greenland was able to buy goods from the United States and Canada by selling cryolite from the mine at Ivittuut. The major air bases were Bluie West-1 at Narsarsuaq and Bluie West-8 at Søndre Strømfjord (Kangerlussuaq), both of which are still used as Greenland's major international airports. Bluie was the military code name for Greenland.

During this war, the system of government changed: Governor Eske Brun ruled the island under a law of 1925 that allowed governors to take control under extreme circumstances; Governor Aksel Svane was transferred to the United States to lead the commission to supply Greenland. The Danish Sirius Patrol guarded the northeastern shores of Greenland in 1942 using dog sleds. They detected several German weather stations and alerted American troops, who destroyed the facilities. After the collapse of the Third Reich, Albert Speer briefly considered escaping in a small aeroplane to hide out in Greenland, but changed his mind and decided to surrender to the United States Armed Forces.

Greenland had been a protected and very isolated society until 1940. The Danish government had maintained a strict monopoly of Greenlandic trade, allowing no more than small scale barter trading with British whalers. In wartime Greenland developed a sense of self-reliance through self-government and independent communication with the outside world. Despite this change, in 1946 a commission including the highest Greenlandic council, the Landsrådene, recommended patience and no radical reform of the system. Two years later, the first step towards a change of government was initiated when a grand commission was established. A final report (G-50) was presented in 1950, which recommended the introduction of a modern welfare state with Denmark's development as sponsor and model. In 1953, Greenland was made an equal part of the Danish Kingdom. Home rule was granted in 1979.

Home rule and self-rule

In 1867, United States Secretary of State William H. Seward worked with former senator Robert J. Walker to explore the possibility of buying Greenland and, perhaps, Iceland. Opposition in Congress ended this project. Following World War II, the United States developed a geopolitical interest in Greenland, and in 1946 the United States offered to buy the island from Denmark for $100,000,000. Denmark refused to sell it. In the 21st century, the United States remains interested in investing in the resource base of Greenland and in tapping hydrocarbons off the Greenlandic coast. In August 2019, the US again proposed to buy the country, prompting premier Kim Kielsen to issue the statement, "Greenland is not for sale and cannot be sold, but Greenland is open for trade and cooperation with other countries — including the United States."

In 1950, Denmark agreed to allow the US to regain the use of Thule Air Base; it was greatly expanded between 1951 and 1953 as part of a unified NATO Cold War defence strategy. The United States tried to construct a subterranean network of secret nuclear missile launch sites in the Greenlandic ice cap, named Project Iceworm. According to documents declassified in 1996, this project was managed from Camp Century from 1960 to 1966 before abandonment as unworkable. The missiles were never fielded, and necessary consent from the Danish Government to do so was never sought. The Danish government did not become aware of the programme's mission until 1997, when they discovered it while looking, in the declassified documents, for records related to the crash of a nuclear equipped B-52 bomber at Thule in 1968.

With the 1953 Danish constitution, Greenland's colonial status ended as the island was incorporated into the Danish realm as an amt (county). Danish citizenship was extended to Greenlanders. Danish policies toward Greenland consisted of a strategy of cultural assimilation — or de-Greenlandification. During this period, the Danish government promoted the exclusive use of the Danish language in official matters, and required Greenlanders to go to Denmark for their post-secondary education. Many Greenlandic children grew up in boarding schools in southern Denmark, and a number lost their cultural ties to Greenland. While the policies "succeeded" in the sense of shifting Greenlanders from being primarily subsistence hunters into being urbanized wage earners, the Greenlandic elite began to reassert a Greenlandic cultural identity. A movement developed in favour of independence, reaching its peak in the 1970s. As a consequence of political complications in relation to Denmark's entry into the European Common Market in 1972, Denmark began to seek a different status for Greenland, resulting in the Home Rule Act of 1979.

This gave Greenland limited autonomy with its own legislature taking control of some internal policies, while the Parliament of Denmark maintained full control of external policies, security, and natural resources. The law came into effect on 1 May 1979. The Queen of Denmark, Margrethe II, remains Greenland's head of state. In 1985, Greenland left the European Economic Community (EEC) upon achieving self-rule, as it did not agree with the EEC's commercial fishing regulations and an EEC ban on seal skin products. Greenland voters approved a referendum on greater autonomy on 25 November 2008. According to one study, the 2008 vote created what "can be seen as a system between home rule and full independence".

On 21 June 2009, Greenland gained self-rule with provisions for assuming responsibility for self-government of judicial affairs, policing, and natural resources. Also, Greenlanders were recognized as a separate people under international law. Denmark maintains control of foreign affairs and defence matters. Denmark upholds the annual block grant of 3.2 billion Danish kroner, but as Greenland begins to collect revenues of its natural resources, the grant will gradually be diminished. This is generally considered to be a step toward eventual full independence from Denmark. Greenlandic was declared the sole official language of Greenland at the historic ceremony.

Tourism

Tourism increased significantly between 2015 and 2019, with the number of visitors increasing from 77,000 per year to 105,000. One source estimated that in 2019 the revenue from this aspect of the economy was about 450 million kroner (US$67 million). Like many aspects of the economy, this slowed dramatically in 2020, and into 2021, due to restrictions required as a result of the COVID-19 pandemic; one source describes it as being the "biggest economic victim of the coronavirus" (the overall economy did not suffer too severely as of mid-2020, thanks to the fisheries "and a hefty subsidy from Copenhagen"). Greenland's goal for returning tourism is to develop it "right" and to "build a more sustainable tourism for the long run".

Geography and climate

Greenland is the world's largest non-continental island and the third largest area in North America after Canada and the United States. It is between latitudes 59° and 83°N, and longitudes 11° and 74°W. Greenland is bordered by the Arctic Ocean to the north, the Greenland Sea to the east, the North Atlantic Ocean to the southeast, the Davis Strait to the southwest, Baffin Bay to the west, the Nares Strait and Lincoln Sea to the northwest. The nearest countries to Greenland are Canada, to the west and southwest across Nares Strait and Baffin Bay, as well as a shared border on Hans Island; and Iceland, southeast of Greenland in the Atlantic Ocean. Greenland also contains the world's largest national park, and it is the largest dependent territory by area in the world, as well as the fourth largest country subdivision in the world, after Sakha Republic in Russia, Australia's state of Western Australia, and Russia's Krasnoyarsk Krai, and the largest in North America.

The lowest temperature ever recorded in the Northern Hemisphere was recorded in Greenland, near the topographic summit of the Greenland Ice Sheet, on 22 December 1991, when the temperature reached .

The ice flows generally to the coast from the centre of the island. A survey led by French scientist Paul-Emile Victor in 1951 concluded that, under the ice sheet, Greenland is composed of three large islands. This is disputed, but if it is so, they would be separated by narrow straits, reaching the sea at Ilulissat Icefjord, at Greenland's Grand Canyon and south of Nordostrundingen.

All towns and settlements of Greenland are situated along the ice-free coast, with the population being concentrated along the west coast. The northeastern part of Greenland is not part of any municipality, but it is the site of the world's largest national park, Northeast Greenland National Park.

At least four scientific expedition stations and camps had been established on the ice sheet in the ice-covered central part of Greenland (indicated as pale blue in the adjacent map): Eismitte, North Ice, North GRIP Camp and The Raven Skiway. There is a year-round station Summit Camp on the ice sheet, established in 1989. The radio station Jørgen Brønlund Fjord was, until 1950, the northernmost permanent outpost in the world.

The extreme north of Greenland, Peary Land, is not covered by an ice sheet, because the air there is too dry to produce snow, which is essential in the production and maintenance of an ice sheet.

In 2003, a small island,  in length and width, was discovered by arctic explorer Dennis Schmitt and his team at the coordinates of 83-42. Whether this island is permanent is not yet confirmed. If it is, it is the northernmost permanent known land on Earth.

In 2007, the existence of a new island was announced. Named "Uunartoq Qeqertaq" (English: Warming Island), this island has always been present off the coast of Greenland, but was covered by a glacier. This glacier was discovered in 2002 to be shrinking rapidly, and by 2007 had completely melted away, leaving the exposed island. The island was named Place of the Year by the Oxford Atlas of the World in 2007. Ben Keene, the atlas's editor, commented: 
 Some controversy surrounds the history of the island, specifically over whether the island might have been revealed during a brief warm period in Greenland during the mid-20th century.

Climate change 

Analysis of the layering and chemical composition of the cores has provided a revolutionary new record of climate change in the Northern Hemisphere going back about 100,000 years and illustrated that the world's weather and temperature have often shifted rapidly from one seemingly stable state to another, with worldwide consequences. The glaciers of Greenland are also contributing to a rise in the global sea level faster than was previously believed. Between 1991 and 2004, monitoring of the weather at one location (Swiss Camp) showed that the average winter temperature had risen almost . Other research has shown that higher snowfalls from the North Atlantic oscillation caused the interior of the ice cap to thicken by an average of  each year between 1994 and 2005.

In July 2021, Greenland banned all new oil and gas exploration in its territory, with government officials stating that the environmental "price of oil extraction is too high".

In August 2021, rain fell on the summit of Greenland's ice cap for the first time in recorded history, which scientists attributed to climate change.

Geology 
The island was part of the very ancient Precambrian continent of Laurentia, the eastern core of which forms the Greenland Shield, while the less exposed coastal strips become a plateau. On these ice-free coastal strips are sediments formed in the Precambrian, overprinted by metamorphism and now formed by glaciers, which continue into the Cenozoic and Mesozoic in parts of the island.

In the east and west of Greenland there are remnants of flood basalts. Notable rock provinces (metamorphic igneous rocks, ultramafics, and anorthosites) are found on the southwest coast at Qeqertarsuatsiaat. East of Nuuk, the banded iron ore region of Isukasia, over three billion years old, contains the world's oldest rocks, such as greenlandite (a rock composed predominantly of hornblende and hyperthene), formed 3.8 billion years ago, and nuummite. In southern Greenland, the Illimaussaq alkaline complex consists of pegmatites such as nepheline, syenites (especially kakortokite or naujaite) and sodalite (sodalite-foya). In Ivittuut, where cryolite was formerly mined, there are fluoride-bearing pegmatites. To the north of Igaliku, there are the Gardar alkaline pegmatitic intrusions of augite syenite, gabbro, etc.

Biodiversity

Greenland is home to two ecoregions: Kalaallit Nunaat high arctic tundra and Kalaallit Nunaat low arctic tundra. There are approximately 700 known species of insects in Greenland, which is low compared with other countries (over one million species have been described worldwide). The sea is rich in fish and invertebrates, especially in the milder West Greenland Current; a large part of the Greenland fauna is associated with marine-based food chains, including large colonies of seabirds. The few native land mammals in Greenland include the polar bear, reindeer (introduced by Europeans), arctic fox, arctic hare, musk ox, collared lemming, ermine, and arctic wolf. The last four are found naturally only in East Greenland, having immigrated from Ellesmere Island. There are dozens of species of seals and whales along the coast. Land fauna consists predominantly of animals which have spread from North America or, in the case of many birds and insects, from Europe. There are no native or free-living reptiles or amphibians on the island.

Phytogeographically, Greenland belongs to the Arctic province of the Circumboreal Region within the Boreal Kingdom. The island is sparsely populated in vegetation; plant life consists mainly of grassland and small shrubs, which are regularly grazed by livestock. The most common tree native to Greenland is the European white birch (Betula pubescens) along with gray-leaf willow (Salix glauca), rowan (Sorbus aucuparia), common juniper (Juniperus communis) and other smaller trees, mainly willows.

Greenland's flora consists of about 500 species of "higher" plants, i.e. flowering plants, ferns, horsetails and lycopodiophyta. Of the other groups, the lichens are the most diverse, with about 950 species; there are 600–700 species of fungi; mosses and bryophytes are also found. Most of Greenland's higher plants have circumpolar or circumboreal distributions; only a dozen species of saxifrage and hawkweed are endemic. A few plant species were introduced by the Norsemen, such as cow vetch.

The terrestrial vertebrates of Greenland include the Greenland dog, which was introduced by the Inuit, as well as European-introduced species such as Greenlandic sheep, goats, cattle, reindeer, horse, chicken and sheepdog, all descendants of animals imported by Europeans. Marine mammals include the hooded seal (Cystophora cristata) as well as the grey seal (Halichoerus grypus). Whales frequently pass very close to Greenland's shores in the late summer and early autumn. Whale species include the beluga whale, blue whale, Greenland whale, fin whale, humpback whale, minke whale, narwhal, pilot whale, sperm whale.

As of 2009, 269 species of fish from over 80 different families are known from the waters surrounding Greenland. Almost all are marine species with only a few in freshwater, notably Atlantic salmon and charr. The fishing industry is the primary industry of Greenland's economy, accounting for the majority of the country's total exports.

Birds, particularly seabirds, are an important part of Greenland's animal life; they consist of both Palearctic and Nearctic species, breeding populations of auks, puffins, skuas, and kittiwakes are found on steep mountainsides. Greenland's ducks and geese include common eider, long-tailed duck, king eider, white-fronted goose, pink-footed goose and barnacle goose. Breeding migratory birds include the snow bunting, lapland bunting, ringed plover, red-throated loon and red-necked phalarope. Non-migratory land birds include the arctic redpoll, ptarmigan, short-eared owl, snowy owl, gyrfalcon and white-tailed eagle.

Politics

The Greenlandic government holds executive power in local government affairs. The head of the government is called Naalakkersuisut Siulittaasuat ("Premier") and serves as head of Greenlandic Government. Any other member of the cabinet is called a Naalakkersuisoq ("Minister"). The Greenlandic parliament is called Inatsisartut ("Legislators"). The parliament currently has 31 members.

In contemporary times, elections are held at municipal, national (Inatsisartut), and kingdom (Folketing) levels.

Greenland is a self-governing entity within the constitutional monarchy of the Kingdom of Denmark, in which Queen Margrethe II is the head of state. The monarch officially retains executive power and presides over the Council of State (privy council). However, following the introduction of a parliamentary system of government, the duties of the monarch have since become strictly representative and ceremonial, such as the formal appointment and dismissal of the prime minister and other ministers in the executive government. The monarch is not answerable for his or her actions, and the monarch's person is sacrosanct.

Political system
The party system was dominated by the social-democratic Forward Party, and the democratic socialist Inuit Community Party, both of which broadly argue for greater independence from Denmark. While the 2009 election saw the unionist Democrat Party (two MPs) decline greatly, the 2013 election consolidated the power of the two main parties at the expense of the smaller groups, and saw the eco-socialist Inuit Party elected to the Parliament for the first time. The dominance of the Forward and Inuit Community parties began to wane after the snap 2014 and 2018 elections.

The non-binding 2008 referendum on self-governance favouring increased self-governance and autonomy was passed winning 76.22% of the vote.

In 1985, Greenland left the European Economic Community (EEC), unlike Denmark, which remains a member. The EEC later became the European Union (EU, renamed and expanded in scope in 1992). Greenland retains some ties through its associated relationship with the EU. However, EU law largely does not apply to Greenland except in the area of trade. Greenland is designated as a member of the Overseas Countries and Territories (OCT) and is thus officially not a part of the European Union, though Greenland can and does receive support from the European Development Fund, Multiannual Financial Framework, European Investment Bank and EU Programmes.

Government

Greenland's head of state is Queen Margrethe II of Denmark. The Queen's government in Denmark appoints a high commissioner (Rigsombudsmand) to represent it on the island. The commissioner is Julie Præst Wilche.

The Greenland constituency elect two MP representatives to the Kingdom Parliament (Folketinget) in Denmark, out of a total of 179. The current representatives are Aki-Matilda Høegh-Dam of the Siumut Party and Aaja Chemnitz Larsen of the Inuit Community Party.

Greenland has national Parliament that consists of 31 representatives. The government is the Naalakkersuisut whose members are appointed by the premier. The head of government is the premier, usually the leader of the majority party in Parliament. The premier is Múte Bourup Egede of the Inuit Ataqatigiit party.

Military

Several American and Danish military bases are located in Greenland, including Thule Air Base, which is home to the United States Space Force's global network of sensors providing missile warning, space surveillance and space control to North American Aerospace Defense Command (NORAD). Elements of the sensor systems are commanded and controlled variously by Space Delta's 2, 4, and 6.

In 1995, a political scandal in Denmark occurred after a report revealed the government had given tacit permission for nuclear weapons to be located in Greenland, in contravention of Denmark's 1957 nuclear-free zone policy. The United States built a secret nuclear powered base, called Camp Century, in the Greenland ice sheet. On 21 January 1968, a B-52G, with four nuclear bombs aboard as part of Operation Chrome Dome, crashed on the ice of the North Star Bay while attempting an emergency landing at Thule Air Base. The resulting fire caused extensive radioactive contamination. One of the H-bombs remains lost.

Administrative divisions

Formerly consisting of three counties comprising a total of 18 municipalities, Greenland abolished these in 2009 and has since been divided into large territories known as "municipalities": Sermersooq ("Much Ice") around the capital Nuuk and also including all East Coast communities; Kujalleq ("South") around Cape Farewell; Qeqqata ("Centre") north of the capital along the Davis Strait; Qeqertalik ("The one with islands") surrounding Disko Bay; and Avannaata ("Northern") in the northwest; the latter two having come into being as a result of the Qaasuitsup municipality, one of the original four, being partitioned in 2018. The northeast of the island composes the unincorporated Northeast Greenland National Park. Thule Air Base is also unincorporated, an enclave within Avannaata municipality administered by the United States Air Force. During its construction, there were as many as 12,000 American residents but in recent years the number has been below 1,000.

Economy

The Greenlandic economy is highly dependent on fishing. Fishing accounts for more than 90% of Greenland's exports. The shrimp and fish industry is by far the largest income earner.

Greenland is abundant in minerals. Mining of ruby deposits began in 2007. Other mineral prospects are improving as prices are increasing. These include iron, uranium, aluminium, nickel, platinum, tungsten, titanium, and copper. Despite resumption of several hydrocarbon and mineral exploration activities, it will take several years before hydrocarbon production can materialize. The state oil company Nunaoil was created to help develop the hydrocarbon industry in Greenland. The state company Nunamineral has been launched on the Copenhagen Stock Exchange to raise more capital to increase the production of gold, started in 2007.

Electricity has traditionally been generated by oil or diesel power plants, even if there is a large surplus of potential hydropower. There is a programme to build hydropower plants. The first, and still the largest, is Buksefjord hydroelectric power plant.

There are also plans to build a large aluminium smelter, using hydropower to create an exportable product. It is expected that much of the labour needed will be imported.

The European Union has urged Greenland to restrict the People's Republic of China development of rare-earth mineral projects, as China accounts for 95% of the world's current supply. However, in early 2013 the government of Greenland said that it had no plans to impose such restrictions.

The public sector, including publicly owned enterprises and the municipalities, plays a dominant role in Greenland's economy. About half the government revenues come from grants from the Danish government, an important supplement to the gross domestic product (GDP). Gross domestic product per capita is equivalent to that of the average economies of Europe.

Greenland suffered an economic contraction in the early 1990s. But, since 1993, the economy has improved. The Greenland Home Rule Government (GHRG) has pursued a tight fiscal policy since the late 1980s, which has helped create surpluses in the public budget and low inflation. Since 1990, Greenland has registered a foreign-trade deficit following the closure of the last remaining lead and zinc mine that year. In 2017, new sources of ruby in Greenland have been discovered, promising to bring new industry and a new export from the country (see Gemstone industry in Greenland).

Transport

There is air transport both within Greenland and between the island and other nations. There is also scheduled boat traffic, but the long distances lead to long travel times and low frequency. There are virtually no roads between cities because the coast has many fjords that would require ferry service to connect a road network. The only exception is a gravel road of  length between Kangilinnguit and the now abandoned former cryolite mining town of Ivittuut. In addition, the lack of agriculture, forestry and similar countryside activities has meant that very few country roads have been built. Greenland has no passenger railways.

Kangerlussuaq Airport (SFJ)  is the largest airport and the main aviation hub for international passenger transport. It serves international and domestic airline operated flight. SFJ is far from the vicinity of the larger metropolitan capital areas,  to the capital Nuuk, and airline passenger services are available.

Nuuk Airport (GOH)  is the second-largest airport located just  from the centre of the capital. GOH serves general aviation traffic and has daily- or regular domestic flights within Greenland. GOH also serves international flights to Iceland, business and private airplanes.

Ilulissat Airport (JAV)  is a domestic airport that also serves international flights to Iceland. There are a total of 13 registered civil airports and 47 helipads in Greenland; most of them are unpaved and located in rural areas. The second longest runway is at Narsarsuaq, a domestic airport with limited international service in south Greenland.

All civil aviation matters are handled by the Danish Transport Authority. Most airports including Nuuk Airport have short runways and can only be served by special fairly small aircraft on fairly short flights. Intercontinental flights connect mainly to Copenhagen. Travel between international destinations (except Iceland) and any city in Greenland requires a plane change.

Icelandair operates flights from Reykjavík to a number of airports in Greenland, and the company promotes the service as a day-trip option from Iceland for tourists.

There are no direct flights to the United States or Canada, although there have been flights Kangerlussuaq – Baltimore, and Nuuk – Iqaluit, which were cancelled because of too few passengers and financial losses. An alternative between Greenland and the United States/Canada is Icelandair with a plane change in Iceland.

Sea passenger transport is served by several coastal ferries. Arctic Umiaq Line makes a single round trip per week, taking 80 hours each direction.

Cargo freight by sea is handled by the shipping company Royal Arctic Line from, to and across Greenland. It provides trade and transport opportunities between Greenland, Europe and North America.

Population

Demographics

Greenland has a population of 56,421 (2021). In terms of country of birth, the population is estimated to be of 89.7% Greenlandic origin (Inuit including European-Inuit multi-ethnic), 7.8% Danish, 1.1% other Nordic and 1.4% other. The multi-ethnic population of European-Inuit represent people of Danish, Norwegian and to a lesser degree of Faroese, Icelandic, Dutch (whalers), German and American descent.

A 2015 wide genetic study of Greenlanders found modern-day Inuit in Greenland are direct descendants of the first Inuit pioneers of the Thule culture who arrived in the 13th century, with approximately 25% admixture of the European colonizers from the 16th century. Despite previous speculations, no evidence of Viking settlers predecessors has been found.

The majority of the population is Lutheran.

The historically important Moravian Brothers (Herrnhuters) were a congregation of faith, in a Danish context based in Christiansfeld in South Jutland, and partially of German origin, but their name does not signify they were ethnic Moravians (Czechs).

Nearly all Greenlanders live along the fjords in the south-west of the main island, which has a relatively mild climate. In 2021, 18,800 people reside in Nuuk, the capital city. Greenland's warmest climates such as the vegetated area around Narsarsuaq are sparsely populated, whereas the majority of the population lives north of 64°N in colder coastal climates.

Greenland is the only country in the Americas where natives make up a majority of the population.

Languages

Both Greenlandic (an Eskaleut language, effectively meaning West Greenlandic) and Danish have been used in public affairs since the establishment of home rule in 1979; the majority of the population can speak both. Greenlandic became the sole official language in June 2009. In practice, Danish is still widely used in the administration and in higher education, as well as remaining the first or only language for some Danish immigrants in Nuuk and other larger towns. Debate about the roles of Greenlandic and Danish in the country's future is ongoing. The orthography of Greenlandic was established in 1851 and revised in 1973. The country has a 100% literacy rate.

A majority of the population speaks West Greenlandic, most of them bi- or tri-lingually. It is spoken by about 50,000 people, making it the most populous of the Eskaleut language family, spoken by more people than all the other languages of the family combined.

Kalaallisut is the language of West Greenland, which has long been the most populous area of the island. This has led to its de facto status as the official "Greenlandic" language, although the northern language Inuktun is spoken by 1,000 or so people around Qaanaaq, and East Greenlandic (Tunumiisut) by around 3,000. Each of these varieties is nearly unintelligible to the speakers of the others. Inuktun is closer to the Inuit languages of Canada than it is to other Greenlandic, and some linguists consider Tunumiit to be a separate language as well. A UNESCO report has labelled the other varieties as endangered, and measures are now being considered to protect East Greenlandic dialect.

About 12% of the population speak Danish as a first or sole language. These are primarily Danish immigrants in Greenland, many of whom fill positions such as administrators, professionals, academics, or skilled tradesmen. While Greenlandic is dominant in all smaller settlements, a part of the population of Inuit or multi-ethnic ancestry, especially in towns, speaks Danish. Most of the Inuit population speaks Danish as a second language. In larger towns, especially Nuuk and in the higher social strata, this is a large group.

English is another important language for Greenland, taught in schools from the first school year.

Education
Education is organized in a similar way to Denmark. There is ten year mandatory primary school. There is also a secondary school, with either work education or preparatory for university education. There is one university, the University of Greenland in Nuuk. Many Greenlanders attend universities in Denmark or elsewhere.

The public school system in Greenland is, as in Denmark, under the jurisdiction of the municipalities: they are therefore municipal schools. The legislature specifies the standards allowed for the content in schools, but the municipal governments decide how the schools under their responsibility are run. Education is free and compulsory for children aged seven to 16. The financial effort devoted to education is now very important (11.3% of GDP). Section 1 of the Government Ordinance on Public Schools (as amended on 6 June 1997) requires Greenlandic as the language of instruction.

Education is governed by Regulation No. 10 of 25 October 1990 on primary and lower secondary education. This regulation was amended by Regulation No. 8 of 13 May 1993 and Regulation No. 1 of 1 March 1994. Under Regulation No. 10 of 25 October 1990, linguistic integration in primary and lower secondary schools became compulsory for all students. The aim is to place Greenlandic-speaking and Danish-speaking pupils in the same classes, whereas previously they were placed in separate classes according to their mother tongue. At the same time, the government guarantees that Danish speakers can learn Greenlandic. In this way, the Greenlandic government wants to give the same linguistic, cultural and social education to all students, both those of Greenlandic and Danish origin. A study, which was carried out during a three-year trial period, concluded that this policy had achieved positive results. This bilingualism policy has been in force since 1994.About 100 schools have been established. Greenlandic and Danish are taught there. Normally, Greenlandic is taught from kindergarten to the end of secondary school, but Danish is compulsory from the first cycle of primary school as a second language. As in Denmark with Danish, the school system provides for "Greenlandic 1" and "Greenlandic 2" courses. Language tests allow students to move from one level to the other. Based on the teachers' evaluation of their students, a third level of courses has been added: "Greenlandic 3". Secondary education in Greenland is generally vocational and technical. The system is governed by Regulation No. 16 of 28 October 1993 on Vocational and Technical Education, Scholarships and Career Guidance. Danish remains the main language of instruction. The capital, Nuuk, has a (bilingual) teacher training college and a (bilingual) university. At the end of their studies, all students must pass a test in the Greenlandic language.

Higher education is offered in Greenland: "university education" (regulation no. 3 of 9 May 1989); training of journalists, training of primary and lower secondary school teachers, training of social workers, training of social educators (regulation no. 1 of 16 May 1989); and training of nurses and nursing assistants (regulation no. 9 of 13 May 1990). Greenlandic students can continue their education in Denmark, if they wish and have the financial means to do so. For admission to Danish educational institutions, Greenlandic applicants are placed on an equal footing with Danish applicants. Scholarships are granted to Greenlandic students who are admitted to Danish educational institutions. To be eligible for these scholarships, the applicant must be a Danish citizen and have had permanent residence in Greenland for at least five years. The total period of residence outside Greenland may not exceed three years.

Religion

The nomadic Inuit were traditionally shamanistic, with a well-developed religion primarily concerned with appeasing a vengeful and fingerless sea goddess called Sedna who controlled the success of the seal and whale hunts.

The first Norse colonists worshipped the Norse gods, but Erik the Red's son Leif was converted to Christianity by King Olaf Trygvesson on a trip to Norway in 999 and sent missionaries back to Greenland. These swiftly established sixteen parishes, some monasteries, and a bishopric at Garðar.

Rediscovering these colonists and spreading ideas of the Protestant Reformation among them was one of the primary reasons for the Danish recolonization in the 18th century. Under the patronage of the Royal Mission College in Copenhagen, Norwegian and Danish Lutherans and German Moravian missionaries searched for the missing Norse settlements, but no Norse were found, and instead they began preaching to the Inuit. The principal figures in the Christianization of Greenland were Hans and Poul Egede and Matthias Stach. The New Testament was translated piecemeal from the time of the very first settlement on Kangeq Island, but the first translation of the whole Bible was not completed until 1900. An improved translation using the modern orthography was completed in 2000. 

Today, the major religion is Protestant Christianity, represented mainly by the Church of Denmark, which is Lutheran in orientation. While there are no official census data on religion in Greenland, the Bishop of Greenland Sofie Petersen estimates that 85% of the Greenlandic population are members of her congregation. The Church of Denmark is the established church through the Constitution of Denmark.

The Roman Catholic minority is pastorally served by the Roman Catholic Diocese of Copenhagen. There are still Christian missionaries on the island, but mainly from charismatic movements proselytizing fellow Christians. According to Operation World, just 4.7% of Greenlanders are Evangelical Christian, although the Evangelical population is growing at an annual rate of 8.4%.

Social issues
The rate of suicide in Greenland is very high. According to a 2010 census, Greenland holds the highest suicide rate in the world. Another significant social issue faced by Greenland is a high rate of alcoholism. Alcohol consumption rates in Greenland reached their height in the 1980s, when it was twice as high as in Denmark, and had by 2010 fallen slightly below the average level of consumption in Denmark (which at the time were 12th highest in the world, but has since fallen). However, at the same time, alcohol prices are far higher, meaning that consumption has a large social impact. Prevalence of HIV/AIDS used to be high in Greenland and peaked in the 1990s when the fatality rate also was relatively high. Through a number of initiatives the prevalence (along with the fatality rate through efficient treatment) has fallen and is now low,  0.13%, below most other countries. In recent decades, the unemployment rates have generally been somewhat above those in Denmark; in 2017, the rate was 6.8% in Greenland, compared to 5.6% in Denmark.

Fertility control

In the 1960s and 1970s, at a time when the population was increasing, 4,500 Greenland Inuit women and girls (roughly half of all fertile females) were fitted with Intrauterine Devices (IUDs) by Danish doctors. Sometimes girls (as young as 12) were taken directly from school to have these devices inserted, without parents' permission being sought. The procedure was also carried out on some Inuit girls at boarding schools in Denmark. On 30 September 2022, the Danish Health Minister, Magnus Heunicke, confirmed that a two-year investigation would try to find out what decisions led to the practice and how it was carried out.

Culture

Today Greenlandic culture is a blending of traditional Inuit (Kalaallit, Tunumiit, Inughuit) and Scandinavian culture. Inuit, or Kalaallit, culture has a strong artistic tradition, dating back thousands of years. The Kalaallit are known for an art form of figures called tupilak or a "spirit object". Traditional art-making practices thrive in the Ammassalik. Sperm whale ivory remains a valued medium for carving.

Music 
Greenland also has a successful, albeit small, music culture. Some popular Greenlandic bands and artists include Sumé (classic rock), Chilly Friday (rock), Nanook (rock), Siissisoq (rock), Nuuk Posse (hip hop) and Rasmus Lyberth (folk), who performed in the Danish national final for the 1979 Eurovision Song Contest, performing in Greenlandic. The singer-songwriter Simon Lynge is the first musical artist from Greenland to have an album released across the United Kingdom, and to perform at the UK's Glastonbury Festival. The music culture of Greenland also includes traditional Inuit music, largely revolving around singing and drums.

The drum is the traditional Greenlandic instrument. It was used to perform traditional drum dances. For this purpose, a round drum (qilaat) in the form of a frame made of driftwood or walrus ribs covered with a polar bear bladder, polar bear stomach or walrus stomach was used. The drumming was not done on the membrane, but with a stick from underneath the frame. Simple melodies were sung for this purpose.

The drum dance used to serve two functions: On the one hand, the drum was used to drive away fear on long, dark winter nights. To do this, the drum dancer would make faces and try to make others laugh until all fear was forgotten.

Disputes were also settled with the drum. If someone had misbehaved, he was challenged with the drum. People would gather at certain powerful places and take turns beating the drum and singing to it. They tried to ridicule the other person as much as possible. The spectators expressed with their laughter who was the winner and who was therefore the guilty one.

The drum could also be used by shamans for ritual conjurations of spirits.

After the arrival of missionaries in the 18th century, the drum dance (still popular among Canadian Inuit today) was banned as pagan and shamanistic and replaced by polyphonic singing of secular and church songs. This choral singing is known today for its special sound. Church hymns are partly of German origin due to the influence of the Herrnhuter Brüdergemeinde. Scandinavian, German and Scottish whalers brought the fiddle, accordion and polka (kalattuut) to Greenland, where they are now played in intricate dance steps.

Sport

Sport is an important part of Greenlandic culture, as the population is generally quite active. Popular sports include association football, track and field, handball and skiing. Handball is often referred to as the national sport, and the men's national team was ranked among the top 20 in the world in 2001.

Greenland has excellent conditions for skiing, fishing, snowboarding, ice climbing and rock climbing, although mountain climbing and hiking are preferred by the general public. Although the environment is generally ill-suited for golf, there is a golf course in Nuuk.

Cuisine 

The national dish of Greenland is suaasat, a soup made from seal meat. Meat from marine mammals, game, birds, and fish play a large role in the Greenlandic diet. Due to the glacial landscape, most ingredients come from the ocean. Spices are seldom used besides salt and pepper. Greenlandic coffee is a "flaming" dessert coffee (set alight before serving) made with coffee, whiskey, Kahlúa, Grand Marnier, and whipped cream. It is stronger than the familiar Irish dessert coffee.

Media 

Kalaallit Nunaata Radioa (KNR) is the public broadcasting company of Greenland. It is an associate member of Eurovision and an associate member of the Nordvision network. Nearly one hundred people are directly employed by this company, which is one of the largest in the territory. The city of Nuuk also has its own radio and television station. The city of Nuuk also has a local television channel, Nanoq Media, which was created on 1 August 2002. It is the largest local television station in Greenland, reaching more than 4,000 households as receiving members, which corresponds to about 75% of all households in the capital.

Today only two newspapers are published in Greenland, both of which are distributed nationally. The Greenlandic weekly Sermitsiaq is published every Friday, while the online version is updated several times a day. It was distributed only in Nuuk until the 1980s. The bi-weekly Atuagagdliutit/Grønlandsposten (AG) is the other newspaper in Greenland, published every Tuesday and Thursday in Greenlandic as Atuagagdliutit and in Danish as Grønlandsposten. The articles are all published in both languages.

Fine arts 
The Inuit have their own arts and crafts tradition; for example, they carve tupilaks, sculptures of figures of avenging monsters practiced within shaman traditions. This sculpture actually represents a mythical or spiritual being; usually, however, it has become a mere collector's item because of its grotesque appearance for Western visual habits. Modern artisans still use indigenous materials such as musk ox and sheep wool, seal fur, shells, soapstone, reindeer antlers or gemstones.

The history of Greenlandic painting began with Aron von Kangeq, who depicted the old Greenlandic sagas and myths in his drawings and watercolours in the mid-19th century. In the 20th century, landscape and animal painting developed, as well as printmaking and book illustrations with sometimes expressive colouring. It was mainly through their landscape paintings that Kiistat Lund and Buuti Pedersen became known abroad. Anne-Birthe Hove chose themes from Greenlandic social life. There is a museum of fine arts in Nuuk, the Nuuk Art Museum.

See also
 Index of Greenland-related articles
 Outline of Greenland
 Danish Realm
 Faroe Islands

Other similar territories 
 Åland (Finland)
 Svalbard (Norway)

Notes

References

Bibliography

 
Oldendow, Knud.(1958). “Printing in Greenland.” Libri: International Journal of Libraries & Information Services 8 (3/4): 223–62.

Works cited

 Bardarson, I. (ed. Jónsson, F.) "Det gamle Grønlands beskrivelse af Ívar Bárðarson (Ivar Bårdssön)", (Copenhagen, 1930) .
 CIA World Factbook, 2000.
 Conkling, P. W. et al. 2011. The Fate of Greenland: Lessons from Abrupt Climate Change, co-authored with Richard Alley, Wallace Broecker and George Denton, with photographs by Gary Comer, MIT Press, Cambridge, Massachusetts.
 
 
 Steffen, Konrad, N. Cullen, and R. Huff (2005). "Climate variability and trends along the western slope of the Greenland Ice Sheet during 1991–2004", Proceedings of the 85th American Meteorological Society Annual Meeting (San Diego).
 
 Sowa, F. 2013. Relations of Power & Domination in a World Polity: The Politics of Indigeneity & National Identity in Greenland. In: Heininen, L. Arctic Yearbook 2013. The Arctic of regions vs. the globalized Arctic. Akureyri: Northern Research Forum, pp. 184–198.www.arcticyearbook.com/ay2013
 Sowa, F. 2014. Greenland. in: Hund, A. Antarctica and the Arctic Circle: A Geographic Encyclopedia of the Earth's Polar Regions. Santa Barbara, California: ABC-CLIO, pp. 312–316.

External links
 Greenland  entry at Denmark.dk.
 
 The Government of Greenland Offices official website
 Visit Greenland – the official Greenlandic Tourist Board
 Inuit Circumpolar Council Greenland

 
Inuit territories
Nordic countries
Regions of the Arctic
Dependent territories in North America
Special territories of the European Union
Island countries
Members of the Nordic Council
States and territories established in 1979
Danish dependencies
Danish-speaking countries and territories
Danish Realm
Former Norwegian colonies
Kingdom of Norway (872–1397)
Christian states
Northern America